Burleson may refer to:

Places
 Burleson, Texas
 Burleson County, Texas
 Old Burleson, Alabama

People with the surname
 Albert S. Burleson, American postmaster general and congressman
 Alec Burleson (born 1998), American baseball player
 Carl Burleson, American government official
 Davis Burleson (born 2003), American social media personality
 Edward Burleson, American general and statesman
 John Burleson (1909-1983), NFL player
 Kevin Burleson, basketball player
 Luther Burleson (1880–1924), American college sports coach
 Nate Burleson, American football player
 Omar Burleson, Member of congress from Abilene, Texas
 Rick Burleson, baseball player
 Rufus Columbus Burleson (1823-1901), president of Baylor University
 Tommy Burleson, basketball player

Other uses
 Burleson LLP, an American law firm
 USS Burleson (APA-67), a ship present at the Operation Crossroads nuclear weapon test on July 1, 1946